The Blaschke selection theorem is a result in topology and convex geometry about sequences of convex sets. The theorem is named for Wilhelm Blaschke.

Alternate statements
 A succinct statement of the theorem is that the metric space of convex bodies is locally compact.
 Using the Hausdorff metric on sets, every infinite collection of compact subsets of the unit ball has a limit point (and that limit point is itself a compact set).

Application

As an example of its use, the isoperimetric problem can be shown to have a solution.  That is, there exists a curve of fixed length that encloses the maximum area possible.  Other problems likewise can be shown to have a solution:
 Lebesgue's universal covering problem for a convex universal cover of minimal size for the collection of all sets in the plane of unit diameter,
 the maximum inclusion problem,
 and the Moser's worm problem for a convex universal cover of minimal size for the collection of planar curves of unit length.

Notes

References

 
 
 

Geometric topology
Compactness theorems

ru:Теорема выбора Бляшке